The Denver Open Invitational was a golf tournament on the PGA Tour that was played intermittently in the Denver, Colorado area from 1947 to 1963. Chi-Chi Rodríguez won his first PGA Tour event at the 1963 tournament, which he calls his biggest thrill in golf.

Winners

References

Former PGA Tour events
Golf in Colorado
Sports competitions in Denver